Continental drift is the hypothesis that the Earth's continents have moved over geologic time relative to each other, thus appearing to have "drifted" across the ocean bed. The idea of continental drift has been subsumed into the science of plate tectonics, which studies the movement of the continents as they ride on plates of the Earth's lithosphere.

The speculation that continents might have 'drifted' was first put forward by Abraham Ortelius in 1596. A pioneer of the modern view of mobilism was the Austrian geologist Otto Ampferer. The concept was independently and more fully developed by Alfred Wegener in 1912, but the hypothesis was rejected by many for lack of any motive mechanism. The English geologist Arthur Holmes later proposed mantle convection for that mechanism.

History

Early history 

Abraham Ortelius , Theodor Christoph Lilienthal (1756), Alexander von Humboldt (1801 and 1845), Antonio Snider-Pellegrini , and others had noted earlier that the shapes of continents on opposite sides of the Atlantic Ocean (most notably, Africa and South America) seem to fit together. W. J. Kious described Ortelius' thoughts in this way:

In 1889, Alfred Russel Wallace remarked, "It was formerly a very general belief, even amongst geologists, that the great features of the earth's surface, no less than the smaller ones, were subject to continual mutations, and that during the course of known geological time the continents and great oceans had, again and again, changed places with each other." He quotes Charles Lyell as saying, "Continents, therefore, although permanent for whole geological epochs, shift their positions entirely in the course of ages." and claims that the first to throw doubt on this was James Dwight Dana in 1849.

In his Manual of Geology (1863), Dana wrote, "The continents and oceans had their general outline or form defined in earliest time. This has been proved with regard to North America from the position and distribution of the first beds of the Lower Silurian, – those of the Potsdam epoch. The facts indicate that the continent of North America had its surface near tide-level, part above and part below it (p.196); and this will probably be proved to be the condition in Primordial time of the other continents also. And, if the outlines of the continents were marked out, it follows that the outlines of the oceans were no less so". Dana was enormously influential in America—his Manual of Mineralogy is still in print in revised form—and the theory became known as the Permanence theory.

This appeared to be confirmed by the exploration of the deep sea beds conducted by the Challenger expedition, 1872–1876, which showed that contrary to expectation, land debris brought down by rivers to the ocean is deposited comparatively close to the shore on what is now known as the continental shelf. This suggested that the oceans were a permanent feature of the Earth's surface, rather than them having "changed places" with the continents.

Eduard Suess had proposed a supercontinent Gondwana in 1885 and the Tethys Ocean in 1893, assuming a land-bridge between the present continents submerged in the form of a geosyncline, and John Perry had written an 1895 paper proposing that the earth's interior was fluid, and disagreeing with Lord Kelvin on the age of the earth.

Wegener and his predecessors 

Apart from the earlier speculations mentioned above, the idea that the American continents had once formed a single landmass with Eurasia and Africa was postulated by several scientists before Alfred Wegener's 1912 paper.  Although Wegener's theory was formed independently and was more complete than those of his predecessors, Wegener later credited a number of past authors with similar ideas:  Franklin Coxworthy (between 1848 and 1890), Roberto Mantovani (between 1889 and 1909), William Henry Pickering (1907) and Frank Bursley Taylor (1908).

The similarity of southern continent geological formations had led Roberto Mantovani to conjecture in 1889 and 1909 that all the continents had once been joined into a supercontinent; Wegener noted the similarity of Mantovani's and his own maps of the former positions of the southern continents. In Mantovani's conjecture, this continent broke due to volcanic activity caused by thermal expansion, and the new continents drifted away from each other because of further expansion of the rip-zones, where the oceans now lie. This led Mantovani to propose a now-discredited Expanding Earth theory.

Continental drift without expansion was proposed by Frank Bursley Taylor, who suggested in 1908 (published in 1910) that the continents were moved into their present positions by a process of "continental creep", later proposing a mechanism of increased tidal forces during the Cretaceous dragging the crust towards the equator. He was the first to realize that one of the effects of continental motion would be the formation of mountains, attributing the formation of the Himalayas to the collision between the Indian subcontinent with Asia. Wegener said that of all those theories, Taylor's had the most similarities to his own. For a time in the mid-20th century, the theory of continental drift was referred to as the "Taylor-Wegener hypothesis".

Alfred Wegener first presented his hypothesis to the German Geological Society on 6 January 1912. His hypothesis was that the continents had once formed a single landmass, called Pangaea, before breaking apart and drifting to their present locations.

Wegener was the first to use the phrase "continental drift" (1912, 1915) (in German "die Verschiebung der Kontinente" – translated into English in 1922) and formally publish the hypothesis that the continents had somehow "drifted" apart. Although he presented much evidence for continental drift, he was unable to provide a convincing explanation for the physical processes which might have caused this drift. He suggested that the continents had been pulled apart by the centrifugal pseudoforce (Polflucht) of the Earth's rotation or by a small component of astronomical precession, but calculations showed that the force was not sufficient. The Polflucht hypothesis was also studied by Paul Sophus Epstein in 1920 and found to be implausible.

Rejection of Wegener's theory, 1910s–1950s 
Although now accepted, the theory of continental drift was rejected for many years, with evidence in its favor considered insufficient. One problem was that a plausible driving force was missing. A second problem was that Wegener's estimate of the speed of continental motion, 250 cm/year, was implausibly high. (The currently accepted rate for the separation of the Americas from Europe and Africa is about 2.5 cm/year). Furthermore, Wegener was treated less seriously because he was not a geologist. Even today, the details of the forces propelling the plates are poorly understood.

The English geologist Arthur Holmes championed the theory of continental drift at a time when it was deeply unfashionable. He proposed in 1931 that the Earth's mantle contained convection cells which dissipated heat produced by radioactive decay and moved the crust at the surface. His Principles of Physical Geology, ending with a chapter on continental drift, was published in 1944.

Geological maps of the time showed huge land bridges spanning the Atlantic and Indian oceans to account for the similarities of fauna and flora and the divisions of the Asian continent in the Permian period, but failing to account for glaciation in India, Australia and South Africa.

The fixists
Hans Stille and Leopold Kober opposed the idea of continental drift and worked on a "fixist" geosyncline model with Earth contraction playing a key role in the formation of orogens. Other geologists who opposed continental drift were Bailey Willis, Charles Schuchert, Rollin Chamberlin, Walther Bucher and Walther Penck. In 1939 an international geological conference was held in Frankfurt. This conference came to be dominated by the fixists, especially as those geologists specializing in tectonics were all fixists except Willem van der Gracht. Criticism of continental drift and mobilism was abundant at the conference not only from tectonicists but also from sedimentological (Nölke), paleontological (Nölke), mechanical (Lehmann) and oceanographic (Troll, Wüst) perspectives. Hans Cloos, the organizer of the conference, was also a fixist who together with Troll held the view that excepting the Pacific Ocean continents were not radically different from oceans in their behaviour. The mobilist theory of Émile Argand for the Alpine orogeny was criticized by Kurt Leuchs. The few drifters and mobilists at the conference appealed to biogeography (Kirsch, Wittmann), paleoclimatology (Wegener, K), paleontology (Gerth) and geodetic measurements (Wegener, K). F. Bernauer correctly equated Reykjanes in south-west Iceland with the Mid-Atlantic Ridge, arguing with this that the floor of the Atlantic Ocean was undergoing extension just like Reykjanes. Bernauer thought this extension had drifted the continents only 100–200 km apart, the approximate width of the volcanic zone in Iceland.

David Attenborough, who attended university in the second half of the 1940s, recounted an incident illustrating its lack of acceptance then: "I once asked one of my lecturers why he was not talking to us about continental drift and I was told, sneeringly, that if I could prove there was a force that could move continents, then he might think about it. The idea was moonshine, I was informed."

As late as 1953—just five years before Carey introduced the theory of plate tectonics—the theory of continental drift was rejected by the physicist Scheidegger on the following grounds.
 First, it had been shown that floating masses on a rotating geoid would collect at the equator, and stay there.  This would explain one, but only one, mountain building episode between any pair of continents; it failed to account for earlier orogenic episodes.
 Second, masses floating freely in a fluid substratum, like icebergs in the ocean, should be in isostatic equilibrium (in which the forces of gravity and buoyancy are in balance). But gravitational measurements showed that many areas are not in isostatic equilibrium.
 Third, there was the problem of why some parts of the Earth's surface (crust) should have solidified while other parts were still fluid. Various attempts to explain this foundered on other difficulties.

Road to acceptance 

From the 1930s to the late 1950s, works by Vening-Meinesz, Holmes, Umbgrove, and numerous others outlined concepts that were close or nearly identical to modern plate tectonics theory.  In particular, the English geologist Arthur Holmes proposed in 1920 that plate junctions might lie beneath the sea, and in 1928 that convection currents within the mantle might be the driving force. Holmes' views were particularly influential: in his bestselling textbook, Principles of Physical Geology, he included a chapter on continental drift, proposing that Earth's mantle contained convection cells which dissipated radioactive heat and moved the crust at the surface.  Holmes' proposal resolved the phase disequilibrium objection (the underlying fluid was kept from solidifying by radioactive heating from the core). However, scientific communication in the '30 and '40s was inhibited by World War II, and the theory still required work to avoid foundering on the orogeny and isostasy objections. Worse, the most viable forms of the theory predicted the existence of convection cell boundaries reaching deep into the earth, that had yet to be observed.

In 1947, a team of scientists led by Maurice Ewing confirmed the existence of a rise in the central Atlantic Ocean, and found that the floor of the seabed beneath the sediments was chemically and physically different from continental crust.  As oceanographers continued to bathymeter the ocean basins, a system of mid-oceanic ridges was detected.  An important conclusion was that along this system, new ocean floor was being created, which led to the concept of the "Great Global Rift".

Meanwhile, scientists began recognizing odd magnetic variations across the ocean floor using devices developed during World War II to detect submarines.  Over the next decade, it became increasingly clear that the magnetization patterns were not anomalies, as had been originally supposed.  In a series of papers in 1959–1963, Heezen, Dietz, Hess, Mason, Vine, Matthews, and Morley collectively realized that the magnetization of the ocean floor formed extensive, zebra-like patterns: one stripe would exhibit normal polarity and the adjoining stripes reversed polarity.  The best explanation was the "conveyor belt" or Vine–Matthews–Morley hypothesis.  New magma from deep within the Earth rises easily through these weak zones and eventually erupts along the crest of the ridges to create new oceanic crust.  The new crust is magnetized by the earth's magnetic field, which undergoes occasional reversals.  Formation of new crust then displaces the magnetized crust apart, akin to a conveyor belt – hence the name.

Without workable alternatives to explain the stripes, geophysicists were forced to conclude that Holmes had been right: ocean rifts were sites of perpetual orogeny at the boundaries of convection cells. By 1967, barely two decades after discovery of the mid-oceanic rifts, and a decade after discovery of the striping, plate tectonics had become axiomatic to modern geophysics.

In addition, Marie Tharp, in collaboration with Bruce Heezen, who was initially sceptical of Tharp's observations that her maps confirmed continental drift theory, provided essential corroboration, using her skills in cartography and seismographic data, to confirm the theory.

Modern evidence
Geophysicist Jack Oliver is credited with providing seismologic evidence supporting plate tectonics which encompassed and superseded continental drift with the article "Seismology and the New Global Tectonics", published in 1968, using data collected from seismologic stations, including those he set up in the South Pacific. The modern theory of plate tectonics, refining Wegener, explains that there are two kinds of crust of different composition: continental crust and oceanic crust, both floating above a much deeper "plastic" mantle. Continental crust is inherently lighter. Oceanic crust is created at spreading centers, and this, along with subduction, drives the system of plates in a chaotic manner, resulting in continuous orogeny and areas of isostatic imbalance.

Evidence for the movement of continents on tectonic plates is now extensive. Similar plant and animal fossils are found around the shores of different continents, suggesting that they were once joined. The fossils of Mesosaurus, a freshwater reptile rather like a small crocodile, found both in Brazil and South Africa, are one example; another is the discovery of fossils of the land reptile Lystrosaurus in rocks of the same age at locations in Africa, India, and Antarctica. There is also living evidence, with the same animals being found on two continents. Some earthworm families (such as Ocnerodrilidae, Acanthodrilidae, Octochaetidae) are found in South America and Africa.

The complementary arrangement of the facing sides of South America and Africa is obvious but a temporary coincidence. In millions of years, slab pull, ridge-push, and other forces of tectonophysics will further separate and rotate those two continents. It was that temporary feature that inspired Wegener to study what he defined as continental drift although he did not live to see his hypothesis generally accepted.

The widespread distribution of Permo-Carboniferous glacial sediments in South America, Africa, Madagascar, Arabia, India, Antarctica and Australia was one of the major pieces of evidence for the theory of continental drift. The continuity of glaciers, inferred from oriented glacial striations and deposits called tillites, suggested the existence of the supercontinent of Gondwana, which became a central element of the concept of continental drift. Striations indicated glacial flow away from the equator and toward the poles, based on continents' current positions and orientations, and supported the idea that the southern continents had previously been in dramatically different locations that were contiguous with one another.

See also 
 
 Israel C. White

Citations

General and cited sources 
 
 
 
  
  (First edition published 1570, 1587 edition online)
 
 .

External links 

 Benjamin Franklin (1782) and Ralph Waldo Emerson (1834) noted Continental Drift
 A brief introduction to Plate Tectonics, based on the work of Alfred Wegener
 Animation of continental drift for last 1 billion years
 Maps of continental drift, from the Precambrian to the future
 3D visualization of what did Earth look like from  750 million years ago to present (at present location of your choice)

Obsolete geology theories
Plate tectonics